Virve Holtsmeier (since 1985 Liiri; born on 2 November 1944 in Suure-Jaani) is an Estonian archer.

In 1968 she graduated from Tallinn Polytechnical Institute's Department of Chemistry.

From 1969 to 1975 she was a member of Soviet Union team.

In 1971 she won silver and in 1975 gold medal at World Arching Championships.

From 1969 to 1976 she became the 13-time Estonian champion in different arching disciplines.

In 1975 she was named as Estonian Athlete of the Year.

References

Living people
1944 births
Estonian female archers
Tallinn University of Technology alumni
People from Suure-Jaani
20th-century Estonian women